Lleyton Hewitt was the defending champion, but lost in the second round this year.

Andy Roddick won the title, defeating Nicolas Mahut 4–6, 7–6(9–7), 7–6(7–2) in the final.

Seeds
The top eight seeds receive a bye into the second round.

Draw

Finals

Top half

Section 1

Section 2

Bottom half

Section 3

Section 4

External links
 Single draw
 Qualifying draw

Singles